Yat with diaeresis (Ѣ̈ ѣ̈) is a letter of the Cyrillic script. It was formerly used in Russian. The letter comes from a yat with a diaeresis.

See also
Ѣ ѣ: Yat

Cyrillic letters with diacritics